Parnassus on Wheels is a 1917 novel written by Christopher Morley and published by Doubleday, Page & Company.  The title refers to the Mount Parnassus of Greek mythology; it was the home of the Muses.

Synopsis
Parnassus on Wheels is Morley's first novel, about a fictional traveling book-selling business.  The original owner of the business, Roger Mifflin, sells it to 39-year-old Helen McGill, who is tired of taking care of her older brother, Andrew.  Andrew is a former businessman turned farmer, turned author.  As an author, he begins using the farm as his Muse rather than a livelihood.  When Mifflin shows up with his traveling bookstore, Helen buys it—partly to prevent Andrew from buying it—and partly to treat herself to a long-overdue adventure of her own.  The first of two novels to be written from a woman's perspective, as well as the prequel to a later novel (The Haunted Bookshop), Parnassus on Wheels was inspired by the novel The Friendly Road by David Grayson (pseudonym of Ray Stannard Baker), and starts with an open letter to Grayson, taking him to task for not concerning himself (except in passing) with his sister's opinion of and reaction to his adventure.

The bookstore-wagon, drawn by a horse named Pegasus, is advertised with a short verse:

Radio adaptation
Parnassus on Wheels was presented on Hallmark Playhouse January 20, 1949. The 30-minute adaptation starred Ruth Hussey.

References

External links
 
Parnassus on Wheels on Google Books
Parnassus on Wheels at Project Gutenberg
 

1917 American novels
Doubleday, Page & Company books
1917 debut novels
Bookstores in fiction